Eckenweiler is a suburban district of Rottenburg am Neckar in the administrative district of Tübingen in Baden-Württemberg (Germany).

Geography 

Eckenweiler is located 13 km (8.07 mi) western from Rottenburg am Neckar, 14 km (8.7 mi) southeastern from Nagold and 12 km (7.45 mi) northeastern from Horb am Neckar. The elevation in the territory of Baisingen is 465 to 532 m.

Extent 

With 198 hectares Eckenweiler has the smallest territory of all districts of Rottenburg. 73.5% of the territory fall upon agriculturally used area, 12.2% upon forest area, 12.2% upon settlement area and roads, 0.5% upon water area and 0.5% upon other.

Population 

Eckenweiler has a population of 514 people (31/01/08). It is one of the smallest districts of Rottenburg. At an area of 1.98 km² (0.8 sq mi) this corresponds to a population density of 260 people per km², or 672 per sq mi.

Faiths 

The population of the village is predominantly Protestant.

References

External links 
 Official Webpage (German)

Rottenburg am Neckar